Zhao Xisha (born 28 September 1992) is a Chinese professional racing cyclist, who currently rides for UCI Women's Continental Team . She is from Hebei.

Major results

2015
 6th Road race, Asian Road Championships
2017
 10th Overall Tour of Zhoushan Island
2019
 1st  Road race, Military World Games
 1st  Road race, National Road Championships
 3rd China Scenic Avenue II
 7th China Scenic Avenue I

See also
 List of 2015 UCI Women's Teams and riders

References

External links
 

1992 births
Living people
Chinese female cyclists
Cyclists from Hebei
21st-century Chinese women